Colonel Lucy Giles is an officer of the British Army's Royal Logistic Corps and the first female College Commander at the Royal Military Academy Sandhurst commanding New College where Officer Cadets spend the second and third terms of the 44-week, 3-term Commissioning Course.

Giles has been in the British Army for 25 years and has served on operations in Sierra Leone, East Timor, Bosnia, Iraq, Northern Ireland and Afghanistan. Giles currently serves as the President of the Army Officer Selection Board.

Giles completed her GCSEs at King Arthur's School, Wincanton and her A levels at Sexey's School, Bruton. She then studied Biology at the University of Exeter where she joined the Officers' Training Corps.

References

Royal Logistic Corps officers
Academics of the Royal Military Academy Sandhurst
People from Wincanton
Living people
People educated at Sexey's School
Year of birth missing (living people)
Women in the British Army